Sir Richard David Arnold (born 23 June 1961) styled the Rt Hon Lord Justice Arnold is a Judge of the Court of Appeal of England and Wales.

Arnold was educated at Highgate School and Magdalen College, Oxford, before gaining a diploma in law from the University of Westminster. 

He was called to the bar in 1985 and made a silk in 2000. He was appointed to the High Court Chancery Division in 2008 becoming the judge in charge of the Patent Court in April 2013. He was promoted to the Court of Appeal on 1 October 2019.

See also

 List of High Court judges of England and Wales

References 

1961 births
Alumni of Magdalen College, Oxford
Alumni of the University of Westminster
Living people
British King's Counsel
Chancery Division judges
Lords Justices of Appeal
People educated at Highgate School
Knights Bachelor
Members of the Privy Council of the United Kingdom